Gayle Greeno (born 1949 in New York City, New York) is an American fantasy author.

Bibliography

Ghatti's Tale
 Finders Seekers (1993)
 MindSpeaker's Call (1994)
 Exiles' Return (1995)

Ghattens' Gambit
 Sunderlies Seeking (1998)
 The Farthest Seeking (2000)

Non-series novels
 Mind Snare (1997)

External links

1949 births
20th-century American novelists
American fantasy writers
American women novelists
Living people
Women science fiction and fantasy writers
20th-century American women writers
21st-century American women